Rhizobius is a genus in the fungi kingdom (see Disease resistance in fruit and vegetables), as well as an obsolete name for the aphid genus Pemphigus.

Rhyzobius is a genus in the lady beetle family (Coccinellidae). It belongs to tribe Coccidulini of subfamily Coccidulinae, which is sometimes subsumed in the Coccinellinae as a tribe with the Coccidulini downranked to subtribe.

The genus was established by J.F. Stephens in 1832. Often misspelled as "Rhizobius", that is actually an older name, now suppressed, for a genus of wooly aphids. The misspelling was first made in the original description in 1832; however, Stephens had used the name in 1829 already (as nomen nudum) and written it "Rhyzobius", so this spelling is used now. Louis Agassiz in 1846 argued that Stephens intended to write "Rhizobius" all along and formally proposed to change the name thus, but this is considered unwarranted.

Species of Rhyzobius can be found almost anywhere on Earth. Rhyzobius lophanthae is used for biological pest control in Australia, namely scale insects (Coccoidea).

Species
106 species are recognised in the most recent worldwide revision, including: 

 Rhyzobius bassus Normand, 1938 g
 Rhyzobius bielawskii Tomaszewska, 2010 g
 Rhyzobius bipartitus Fuente, 1918 g
 Rhyzobius chrysomeloides (Herbst, 1792) g
 Rhyzobius fagus (Broun, 1880) g
 Rhyzobius forestieri (Mulsant, 1853) i c g b
 Rhyzobius litura (Fabricius, 1787) g
 Rhyzobius lophanthae (Blaisdell, 1892) i c g b (purple scale predator)
 Rhyzobius nigripennis Fauvel, 1903 g
 Rhyzobius oculatissimus Wollaston, 1857 g
 Rhyzobius pulchellus (Montrouzier, 1861) g
 Rhyzobius ventralis (Erichson, 1842) i c g
 Rhyzobius wanati Tomaszewska, 2010 g

Data sources: i = ITIS, c = Catalogue of Life, g = GBIF, b = Bugguide.net

Footnotes

References
  (2002): Prospects for extending the use of Australian lacewings in biological control. Acta Zool. Acad. Sci. Hung. 48(Supplement 2): 209–216. PDF fulltext
  (2007): New species of Epipleuria Fürsch and Rhyzobius Stephens from southern Africa (Coleoptera: Coccinellidae: Coccidulini). Annals of the Transvaal Museum 44: 11-24. HTML abstract

External links

Coccinellidae genera
Taxa named by James Francis Stephens